Dr Roberta Anne 'Bobbie' Vaile (25 June 1959 – 13 November 1996) was an Australian astrophysicist and senior lecturer in physics at the Faculty of Business and Technology at the University of Western Sydney, Macarthur. She was involved with Project Phoenix (a SETI experiment) and influential in the establishment of the SETI Australia Centre, created at the university in 1995. She died following a seven-year battle with an inoperable brain tumour.

Bobbie was born in Junee, New South Wales. She attended the University of Newcastle, where she received her B.Sc. She earned her Ph.D. at the University of New South Wales with a thesis entitled "The Corona Australis Complex" in 1989.

Bobbie was awarded the Australian Science Communicators' "Unsung Hero of Australian Science" award in 1995 for her work in developing easy and friendly methods of teaching science.

Other published papers include:
- Seth Shostak, Ron Ekers, Roberta Vaile, 1996. A Search for Artificial Signals from the Small Magellanic Cloud The Astronomical Journal 112, 164-166.

A memorial garden at the University of Western Sydney was dedicated to Bobbie in 1999, and there is a park/reserve in Camden, New South Wales (at ), named after her. The binary main-belt asteroid 6708 Bobbievaile, discovered by Australian astronomer Robert McNaught in 1989 was also named in her memory. 
Naming citation was published on 22 April 1997.

References

External links 
  - Bobbie Vaile Reserve
  - Bioastronomy News, Fall 1993, Vol 4
  - Bright Sparcs biography
  - SETI articles listing
  - SETI Australia Centre
  - SETI Australia Centre - Bobbie Vaile Page
  - Women in Astronomy reference
  - Planetary Society, Australian Volunteers Page
  - Positive Consequences of SETI Before Detection paper
  - QUICKSMART - Introductory Physics
  - ASC Unsung Hero Bobbie Vaile page
  - SETI News article
  - Smithsonian/NASA ADS abstract of "The Corona Australis Complex" paper
   - Tributes

20th-century Australian astronomers
Women astronomers
1959 births
1996 deaths
University of New South Wales alumni
People from Junee
20th-century Australian women scientists